Horace Fielding (14 October 1906 – 14 June 1969) was an English professional footballer who played as a winger.

References

1906 births
1969 deaths
People from Heywood, Greater Manchester
English footballers
Association football wingers
Mossley A.F.C. players
Stockport County F.C. players
Grimsby Town F.C. players
Reading F.C. players
Crystal Palace F.C. players
Mansfield Town F.C. players
Peterborough United F.C. players
English Football League players